Firebrick (previously known as Spencer) is an unincorporated community in Washington Township, Lawrence County, Ohio, United States.

History
The Firebrick Post Office was established in the Donley Store on April 14, 1911. Wm. S. Hamilton was the first Postmaster, followed by Chester C. Donley. It then became a Rural Branch of the Oak Hill Post Office on September 1, 1959, and was discontinued entirely between 1973 and 1974. Mail service is now sent through the Oak Hill branch.

References

Unincorporated communities in Lawrence County, Ohio